Kwame Otu (born 11 January 2002) is a Ghanaian professional footballer who plays as a forward for Ghanaian Premier League side Dreams F.C.

Career

Dreams FC

Youth career 
Otu played for and is a product of the Dreams FC youth side Still Believe FC. He was promoted to the senior team in 2019.

Senior career 
In December 2019, Otu was promoted from the senior team in January 2019, ahead of the 2019–20 Ghana Premier League season. On 5 January 2020, he made his debut in a 1–o victory over West African Football Academy (WAFA), coming on in the 57th minute for Emmanuel Ocran. He scored his On 27 January 2020, he scored his debut goal after scoring a consolation goal in the 90+ minute in a 2–1 loss to Ebusua Dwarfs. He went on and played 10 league matches and scored in 1 before the league was cancelled as a result of the COVID-19 pandemic.

With the league set to restart for the 2020–21 Ghana Premier League season, he was named on the team's senior squad list.

References

External links 

Living people
2002 births
Association football forwards
Ghanaian footballers
Dreams F.C. (Ghana) players
Ghana Premier League players
Ghana A' international footballers
2022 African Nations Championship players